Tumsa Nahin Dekha: A Love Story (transl. I Haven't Seen Anyone Like You) is a 2004 Indian Hindi musical romantic drama film directed by Anurag Basu produced by Mukesh Bhatt, written by Subodh Chopra and starring Emraan Hashmi and Dia Mirza in lead roles with Sharat Saxena, Surekha Sikri, Uday Tikekar, Atul Parchure and Anupam Kher in supporting roles. It was released on 24 September 2004. Upon release, the film received mixed to negative reviews, having a 18% Rating on RottenTomatoes.

Synopsis 

The film starts with Daksh Mittal (Emraan Hashmi), a charming and continually drunk billionaire. One day, he runs into a girl, Jiya (Dia Mirza) on the street and falls in love at first sight. Jiya is working as a dancer and has a mentally disabled brother. Daksh and Jiya spend some time with each other and fall in love. Daksh, however, is supposed to marry Anahita Madhwani (Pooja Bharati) in order to inherit a million-dollar trust.

For help, Daksh turns to his butler, John Uncle (Anupam Kher). John Uncle wanted Daksh to end up marrying Jiya. However, John gets very ill and gets admitted to a hospital. The engagement party for Daksh and Anahita is taking place and John Uncle manages to convince Jiya to go to the party.

Daksh and Jiya dance, and meanwhile, John Uncle is dying at the hospital. Daksh decides to honour John Uncle's memory and goes to propose to Jiya – she accepts and after a final clash with the family, Daksh is allowed to marry her and they live happily ever after.

Cast

Soundtrack
The music of this movie was given by Nadeem-Shravan. The album features 9 songs with 8 original tracks and one other version of Bheed Mein. The song Yeh Dhuan Dhuan features Richard Clayderman with the lead vocalist Roopkumar Rathod. The response for album was excellent at music platforms in India. Singers like (singer) Legendery Udit Narayan, Shreya Ghoshal, Roop Kumar Rathod, Sonu Nigam and Shaan have lent their voices in this album.

References

External links

2000s Hindi-language films
Films scored by Nadeem–Shravan
Indian remakes of American films